Jeon Jin-woo (born 9 September 1999), formerly known as Jeon Se-jin, is a South Korean football forward who plays for Suwon Samsung Bluewings.

Club career
On 30 January 2018, Jeon made his professional debut at the 2018 AFC Champions League play-off round against Thanh Hóa FC.

Career statistics

Honours

International

South Korea U20
FIFA U-20 World Cup runner-up: 2019

References

External links 
 

1999 births
Living people
Association football forwards
South Korean footballers
Suwon Samsung Bluewings players
K League 1 players
South Korea under-20 international footballers